This is a list of video games published by the video game publisher Strategy First.

C
Call for Heroes: Pompolic Wars
Celtic Kings: Rage of War
Chariots of War
Chrome
Clans 
Clusterball
Cuban Missile Crisis: The Aftermath
Culpa Innata
cloud Raiders

D
Dangerous Waters
Diggles: The Myth Of Fenris
Disciples: Sacred Lands (Gold Edition)
Disciples II: Dark Prophecy
Disciples III: Renaissance
Dragon Throne: Battle of Red Cliffs
Ducati World Championship

E
Earth 2150: Lost Souls
Emergency 3
Empire of the Ants
Etherlords
Etherlords II
Europa Universalis
Europa Universalis II
Europa Universalis: Crown of the North

F
FlatOut 3: Chaos & Destruction
FlatOut 4: Total Insanity
Fleet Command
Football Deluxe

G
Galactic Civilizations
Galactic Civilizations: Altarian Prophecy
Galactic Dream - Rage of war
Gods: Lands of Infinity
Great Invasions
Gun Metal

H
Hearts of Iron

I
I of the Dragon
Inquisition
Iron Warriors: T-72 Tank Commander
Ironclads: American Civil War

J
Jack Keane
Jagged Alliance
Jagged Alliance 2
Jagged Alliance 2: Wildfire

K
Kohan: Ahriman's Gift
Kohan: Immortal Sovereigns
Konung: Legends of the North

L
Legion Arena
Legion Gold

M
Making History: The Calm & The Storm
Micro Commandos
Mistmare

N
New World Order

O
O.R.B: Off-World Resource Base

P
Perimeter 2: New Earth
Platoon
Prince of Qin

R
Rails Across America
Robin Hood: The Legend of Sherwood

S
Seal of Evil
Space Empires IV
Space Empires V
Space Empires: Star Fury
Steel Beasts
Strike Fighters: Project 1
Sub Command
Submarine Titans
Sudden Strike
Supreme Ruler 2010
Solid Ice

T
Time of Defiance
Timelines: Assault on America
The Outforce
The Partners
Two Thrones

U
Uplink: Hacker Elite

V
Vendetta Online
Victoria: An Empire Under the Sun

W
War Times
Warrior Kings: Battles

External links
 List of Strategy First games from MobyGames

 
Strategy First